Javier S. Peres is a contemporary art dealer and gallery owner. His gallery, Peres Projects, is in the Karl-Marx-Allee in Berlin, and has offices in Los Angeles, California.

Biography 

Peres started Peres Projects in San Francisco, California, in 2002. He was included in the Art Review Power 100 in 2006. He collects premodern African Art.

References

Fogel, Jonathan (2016) "#Obsessed: Javier Peres and African Art," Tribal Art Magazine, Issue 79, April 2016, pp. 120 – 127.
Neave, Kate (2015) "Javier Peres on embracing the extreme," Dazed Digital, December 2015. http://www.dazeddigital.com/artsandculture/article/22759/1/javier-peres-embracing-the-extreme 
Carroll, Jessiva (2012) "Portfolio: Javier Peres," Toronto Standard, January 12, 2012. http://www.torontostandard.com/culture/portfolio-javier-peres/
Finel Honigman, Ana (2011) "A River Runs Through Javier Peres," Interview Magazine, December 22, 2011. http://www.interviewmagazine.com/art/javier-peres-river/
Bellini, Andrea (2006) "Cautious Alternatives: A New York Tale," Flash Art No. 249, July - September 2006, pp. 106 – 111.
Chaplin, Julia (2006) "Art on the Edge in Mexico City," The New York Times, Travel Section.
Kunitz, Daniel (2006) "The Generous Pirate," Art Review, May 2006, pp. 66 – 70.
Editorial (2006) "Galleries Top Ten," Bon Magazine, Summer 2006, p. 40.

Living people
1972 births